The Du Pré Stradivarius  is an antique cello fabricated in 1673 by Italian luthier Antonio Stradivari of Cremona (1644–1737).  It has also been known generically as the 1673 Stradivarius, as it is the only cello made by Stradivari in that year.

Recent owners of The 1673 have included the cellists Jacqueline du Pré (1945–1987), Lynn Harrell and Nina Kotova. 

Harrell purchased the cello from the ailing du Pré in 1984, and subsequently took legal steps to have the cello renamed the Jacqueline du Pré Stradivari. While visiting New York, Harrell forgot his cello when leaving a taxicab. The cab driver turned it in, and it was returned unscathed.

The cello is currently being played by István Várdai.

References

External links

1673 works
Stradivari cellos
Stradivari instruments